The Europe/Africa Zone was one of the three zones of the regional Davis Cup competition in 1996.

In the Europe/Africa Zone there were three different tiers, called groups, in which teams competed against each other to advance to the upper tier. Winners in Group II advanced to the Europe/Africa Zone Group I. Teams who lost their respective ties competed in the relegation play-offs, with winning teams remaining in Group II, whereas teams who lost their play-offs were relegated to the Europe/Africa Zone Group III in 1997.

Participating nations

Draw

 and  promoted to Group I in 1997.

First round

Great Britain vs. Slovenia

Ghana vs. Malta

Egypt vs. Macedonia

Latvia vs. Ivory Coast

Poland vs. Nigeria

Luxembourg vs. Belarus

Yugoslavia vs. Slovakia

Algeria vs. Portugal

Second round

Ghana vs. Great Britain

Egypt vs. Ivory Coast

Poland vs. Belarus

Slovakia vs. Portugal

Relegation play-offs

Slovenia vs. Malta

Macedonia vs. Latvia

Yugoslavia vs. Algeria

Third round

Great Britain vs. Egypt

Slovakia vs. Poland

References

External links
Davis Cup official website

Davis Cup Europe/Africa Zone
Europe Africa Zone Group II